Rosa Mundi was the name of a very short-lived electronic music supergroup which consisted of Rose McDowall, John Balance and possibly Peter Christopherson. The group is credited for "The Snow Man" which appeared on the compilations The Final Solstice and The Final Solstice II and the split 7-inch vinyl Grief. It is also credited on the song "Christmas Is Now Drawing Near" from the Coil single Winter Solstice: North, later released on Moons Milk (In Four Phases). Since both songs, "The Snow Man" and "Christmas Is Now Drawing Near", were originally released in 1999, it can be said that this is the only year the group functioned.

However, the song "Rosa Decidua" from the 1998 Coil EP Autumn Equinox: Amethyst Deceivers, while not credited to Rosa Mundi, has exactly the same line-up.

Alternatively, some critics have inferred that "Rosa Mundi" is simply an alternative name for Rose McDowall, and not the name of a group at all.

Discography

Compilation appearances
"The Snowman" on Grief
"The Snowman" on The Final Solstice/The Final Solstice II

Guest appearances
"Christmas Is Now Drawing Near" on Winter Solstice: North
"Christmas Is Now Drawing Near" on Moons Milk (In Four Phases)

References

English electronic music groups
British experimental musical groups
Musical groups from London
British supergroups
Electronic music supergroups